Charles Edwin Moore (August 2, 1903 – May 11, 1988)  was a justice of the Iowa Supreme Court from April 17, 1962, to August 2, 1978, appointed from Polk County, Iowa, United States.

Born on the east side of Des Moines, Iowa, Moore received his law degree from Drake University. He was elected to the Des Moines Municipal Court in 1936, at age 32, and to the Polk County, Iowa, District Court in 1942. In 1962, Governor Norman Erbe appointed Moore to a seat on the state supreme court, and in 1969 the members of the court chose him as their chief justice.

Moore married Margaret Douglas, of Des Moines, becoming the stepfather to her two sons.

References

External links

Justices of the Iowa Supreme Court
Drake University Law School alumni
1903 births
1988 deaths